"More Trucks Than Cars" is a song co-written and recorded by American country music artist Craig Morgan.  It was released in August 2012 as the third single from Morgan's album This Ole Boy.  The song was written by Morgan, Phil O'Donnell and Craig Wiseman.

Critical reception
Billy Dukes of Taste of Country gave it four stars out of five, saying that "‘More Trucks Than Cars’ is pure country, with the only criticism being it’s not an original in a category he’s refined."

Chart performance
"More Trucks Than Cars" debuted at number 56 on the Hot Country Songs chart for the week of September 15, 2012.

Year-end charts

References

2012 singles
2011 songs
Craig Morgan songs
Songs written by Craig Morgan
Songs written by Craig Wiseman
Black River Entertainment singles
Songs written by Phil O'Donnell (songwriter)